The Macao Special Administrative Region of the People's Republic of China passport is a passport issued to Chinese citizens who are permanent residents of Macau.

In accordance with Macau Basic Law, since the transfer of sovereignty over Macau on 20 December 1999, this passport has been issued by the Identification Services Bureau (under the Secretariat for Administration and Justice) of the government of Macau under the prerogative of the Central People's Government of the People's Republic of China.

The official languages of Macau are Portuguese and Chinese; consequently, all the passport's text is in Traditional Chinese characters and Portuguese in addition to English.

Historical background 
According to the nationality law of the People's Republic of China and the explanations given for some questions by the Standing Committee of the National People's Congress concerning the implementation of nationality law in Macau, any Macau permanent resident holding Chinese nationality can apply for the Macau SAR passport.

Many residents of Macau also possess Portuguese citizenship by virtue of being born in Macau before 3 October 1981, naturalization, or being born to parents with Portuguese citizenship in Macau. Such citizens are also eligible for, and often hold, a Portuguese passport, which grants more visa-free countries than the MSAR passport as well as permitting free movement of passport holders in the European Union.

Physical features 
The 2nd version of the passport, a biometric passport, was first issued by the Identification Services Bureau at the start of September 2009, replacing the previous machine-readable type.

The cover of the passport is coloured bottle green with the National Emblem of the People's Republic of China emblazoned centermost at the front. Each passport consists of 48 numbered pages of size  emprinted with artistic designs featuring Macau's world culture heritage sites.

Besides personal data, the supplemental page of passport is printed with the picture and fingerprint of that holder.

Application procedure 
Macau SAR passports are only issued by the Identification Services Bureau in Macau. An applicant must fill out an application form, possess a Macau SAR Permanent Resident Identity Card and two recent 1½-inch colour photos along with (if replacing an old passport) their prior Macau SAR Passport.

Qualified applicants can apply in Macau or overseas if necessary.

Use

Mainland China 
Although MSAR passport is endorsed by Chinese government, the Ministry of Public Security does not accept MSAR passports for traveling between the mainland and Macau, since both mainland and Macau authorities agreed that using a passport for 'domestic' travel is 'unnecessary' and 'inappropriate'. However, those who are eligible for a Macau SAR passport are also eligible to apply for a Mainland Travel Permit for Hong Kong and Macao Residents (colloquially known as a Home Return Permit through the Chinese Ministry of Public Security (MPS) which serves as a travel document to travel to the mainland, which is represented in Macau by the China Travel Service. The issuance is entirely at the discretion of the MPS, and so the possession of a Macau SAR passport does not necessarily guarantee the issuing of a Home Return Permit.

Macao residents who travel to the mainland from a third country without Home Return Permit may obtain Chinese Travel Document from the overseas Chinese embassies or consulates prior to travel.

Hong Kong 
Regardless of their citizenship status, Macau permanent residents do not need passports to enter Hong Kong. Instead, residents must bring their permanent ID card, which grants 180-day visa free access to Hong Kong. Non-permanent residents can use a Visit Permit for Residents of Macao to HKSAR to enter Hong Kong for up to 30 days visa-free

Overseas 

According to Macau's Identity Services Bureau, as of January 2018 Macau SAR passport holders enjoy visa-free access to 136 countries and territories worldwide, including all Member States of the European Union, Brazil, Japan, Malaysia, Russia, Singapore, South Africa and South Korea.  According to the Henley Passport Index, in 2019 the Macau SAR passport was ranked as the 36th most powerful passport worldwide; in contrast, the Hong Kong SAR passport was ranked 19th, while the PRC passport was ranked 74th.

As Chinese citizens, holders of a Macau Special Administrative Region passport are entitled to full consular protection by Chinese foreign missions abroad.

Macau SAR passport holders may undertake a paid activity (i.e. work) visa-free for a maximum of 90 days within a 180-day period in the Schengen Agreement signatory states of Belgium, Denmark, Iceland, Lithuania, Luxembourg, the Netherlands, Norway, Slovenia and Sweden (though not in Portugal).  In Switzerland, another Schengen signatory state, Macao SAR passport holders can apply for a permit for "gainful occupation" of maximum 8 days in a calendar year during their visa-exempt stay without needing to apply for a work visa; however, this 8-day exemption does not cover occupation in the primary or secondary construction industry, civil engineering, catering and hotel services, industrial and private cleaning industries, surveillance and security services, and sex industry. Alternatively, if in possession of a long term residence permit issued by any other Schengen member state, a Macau SAR passport holder may undertake gainful occupation for up to 3 months visa-free in Switzerland without any of the aforementioned industry restrictions. In Croatia (a European Union member state but not a Schengen agreement signatory state), Macao SAR passport holders may undertake a paid activity (i.e. work) visa-free for a maximum of 90 days within a 180-day period.

Macau SAR passport holders aged between 18 and 30 are eligible to apply under the Working Holiday Scheme by the New Zealand Government.  If successful, a visa is issued which permits the holder to spend up to 12 months in New Zealand for the primary purpose of travel but allowing for supplementary short-term employment or study. The scheme is highly competitive as applicants from Macau and Mainland China are subject to a quota of 1000 visas annually (there is a separate quota for Hong Kong applicants).

On 10 April 2013, the Prime Minister of Australia, Julia Gillard, announced that, starting from 2015, holders of Macao SAR e-passports (along with Hong Kong SAR and PRC passport holders) would be able to use SmartGates in Australia on a trial basis. The three passports were permanently included in the list of eligible nationalities in June 2016.

See also 

 Visa policy of Macau
 Visa requirements for Chinese citizens of Macau

References

External links 
 Macau SAR Identification Department
 Macau SAR Government Portal

Chinese passports
Government of Macau
Tourism in Macau
Macau society